The 1975 Council of Ministers was the Council of Ministers formed by the Fretilin political party in 1975 as the inaugural administration or cabinet of the Democratic Republic of East Timor proclaimed in November 1975.

History
On 28 November 1975, Fretilin made a unilateral declaration of independence of East Timor from Portuguese colonial rule. On 30 November 1975, the party caused a "Constitution of the Democratic Republic of Timor-Leste (RDTL)" to be read out at an inauguration ceremony for Francisco Xavier do Amaral as the newly appointed President of its new republic.

Article 40 of the new constitution provided for the establishment of a Council of Ministers. On 1 December 1975, Fretilin inaugurated that body.

By that time, however, Indonesian armed forces had infiltrated significant parts of the territory of East Timor, especially in what is now the Bobonaro Municipality, adjacent to the border with Indonesian West Timor. Just under a week later, on 7 December 1975, Indonesia began a full-scale invasion of East Timor, focused on Dili, the capital of the territory.

Composition
The Council of Ministers was made up of Ministers and Vice Ministers, as follows:

Ministers

Vice Ministers

See also
 Proclamation of Independence Day

References

Notes

Bibliography

 
 
 
 
 
 

Cabinets established in 1975
 
1975 establishments in East Timor